Ametropus is a genus of sand minnows in the family Ametropodidae. There are at least three described species in Ametropus.

Species
These three species belong to the genus Ametropus:
 Ametropus ammophilus Allen & Edmunds, 1976
 Ametropus fragilis Albarda, 1878
 Ametropus neavei McDunnough, 1928

References

Further reading

 
 

Mayflies
Articles created by Qbugbot